The Otadaonanis River is a river in northeastern Kenora District in northwestern Ontario, Canada. It is in the James Bay drainage basin and is a right tributary of the Kapiskau River.

References

Sources

"Otadaonanis River" at Atlas of Canada. Accessed 2016-04-24.

Rivers of Kenora District